The Stoner–Wohlfarth model is a widely used model for the magnetization of single-domain ferromagnets. It is a simple example of magnetic hysteresis and is useful for modeling small magnetic particles in magnetic storage, biomagnetism, rock magnetism and paleomagnetism.

History 
The Stoner–Wohlfarth model was developed by Edmund Clifton Stoner and Erich Peter Wohlfarth and published in 1948. It included a numerical calculation of the integrated response of randomly oriented magnets. Since this was done before computers were widely available, they resorted to trigonometric tables and hand calculations.

Description

In the Stoner–Wohlfarth model, the magnetization does not vary within the ferromagnet and it is represented by a vector . This vector rotates as the magnetic field  changes. The magnetic field is only varied along a single axis; its scalar value  is positive in one direction and negative in the opposite direction. The ferromagnet is assumed to have a uniaxial magnetic anisotropy with anisotropy parameter . As the magnetic field varies, the magnetization is restricted to the plane containing the magnetic field direction and the easy axis. It can therefore be represented by a single angle , the angle between the magnetization and the field (Figure 1). Also specified is the angle  between the field and the easy axis.

Equations 
The energy of the system is

The first term is the magnetic anisotropy and the second the energy of coupling with the applied field (often called the Zeeman energy).

Stoner and Wohlfarth normalized this equation:

where .
A given magnetization direction is in mechanical equilibrium if the forces on it are zero. This occurs when the first derivative of the energy with respect to the magnetization direction is zero:

This direction is stable against perturbations when it is at an energy minimum, having a positive second derivative:

In zero field the magnetic anisotropy term is minimized when the magnetization is aligned with the easy axis. In a large field, the magnetization is pointed towards the field.

Hysteresis loops 

For each angle  between easy axis and field, equation has a solution that consists of two solution curves.

An example is shown in Figure 2. The solid red and blue curves connect stable magnetization directions. For fields , the two curves overlap and there are two stable directions. This is the region where hysteresis occurs. Three energy profiles are included (insets). The red and blue stars are the stable magnetization directions, corresponding to energy minima. Where the vertical dashed lines intersect the red and blue dashed lines, the magnetization directions are energy maxima and determine the energy barriers between states.

In an ordinary magnetic hysteresis measurement,  starts at a large positive value and is decreased to a large negative value. The magnetization direction starts on the blue curve. At  the red curve appears, but for  the blue state has a lower energy because it is closer to the direction of the magnetic field. When the field becomes negative, the red state has the lower energy, but the magnetization cannot immediately jump to this new direction because there is an energy barrier in between (see the insets). At , however, the energy barrier disappears, and in more negative fields the blue state no longer exists. It must therefore jump to the red state. After this jump, the magnetization remains on the red curve until the field increases past , where it jumps to the blue curve. Usually only the hysteresis loop is plotted; the energy maxima are only of interest if the effect of thermal fluctuations is calculated.

The Stoner–Wohlfarth model is a classic example of magnetic hysteresis.

Dependence on field direction 

The shape of the hysteresis loop has a strong dependence on the angle between the magnetic field and the easy axis (Figure 3). The magnetization starts parallel to the field and does not rotate until it becomes unstable and jumps to the opposite direction. In general, the larger the angle, the more reversible rotation occurs. The magnetization rotates continuously from one direction to the other (it has two choices of rotation direction, though).

For a given angle , the switching field is the point where the solution switches from an energy minimum  to an energy maximum . The solution is

where

In normalized units, .

An alternative way of representing the switching field solution is to divide the vector field  into a component  that is parallel to the easy axis, and a component  that is perpendicular. Then

If the components are plotted against each other, the result is a Stoner–Wohlfarth astroid. A magnetic hysteresis loop can be calculated by applying a geometric construction to this astroid.

Predictions for homogeneous, isotropic systems

Hysteresis 

Stoner and Wohlfarth calculated the main hysteresis loop for an isotropic system of randomly oriented, identical particles. The result of the calculation is reproduced in Figure 4. The normalized saturation remanence  and coercivity  are indicated on the figure. The curve in the center is the initial magnetization curve. This simulates the behavior of the sample if it is demagnetized before applying a field. The demagnetization is assumed to leave each particle with an equal probability of being magnetized in either of the two directions parallel to the easy axis. Thus, it is an average of the upper and lower branches of the main loop.

Isothermal remanence 

Some remanence calculations for randomly oriented, identical particles are shown in Figure 5. Isothermal remanent magnetization (IRM) is acquired after demagnetizing the sample and then applying a field. The curve  shows the normalized remanence as a function of the field. Up to this field, changes in magnetization are reversible.

Again, nothing happens to the remanence until the field reaches . The field at which  reaches zero is called the coercivity of remanence.

Some magnetic hysteresis parameters predicted by this calculation are shown in the adjacent table. The normalized quantities used in the above equations have been expressed in terms of the normal measured quantities.

More general systems 

The above calculations are for identical particles. In a real sample the magnetic anisotropy parameter  will be different for each particle. This does not change the ratio , but it does change the overall shape of the loop. A parameter that is often used to characterize the shape of the loop is the ratio , which is 1.09 for a sample with identical particles and larger if they are not identical. Plots of  against  are widely used in rock magnetism as a measure of the domain state (single-domain or multidomain) in magnetic minerals.

Wohlfarth relations 

Wohlfarth identified relations between the remanences that hold true for any system of Stoner–Wohlfarth particles:

These Wohlfarth relations compare IRM with demagnetization of saturation remanence. Wohlfarth also described more general relations comparing the acquiring a non-saturation IRM and demagnetizing it.

The Wohlfarth relations can be represented by linear plots of one remanence against another. These Henkel plots are often used to display measured remanence curves of real samples and determine whether Stoner–Wohlfarth theory applies to them.

Extensions of the model 
The Stoner–Wohlfarth model is useful in part because it is so simple, but it often falls short of representing the actual magnetic properties of a magnet. There are several ways in which it has been extended:
 Generalizing the magnetic anisotropy: Hysteresis loops have been calculated for particles with pure cubic magnetocrystalline anisotropy as well as mixtures of cubic and uniaxial anisotropy.
 Adding thermal fluctuations: Thermal fluctuations make jumps between stable states possible, reducing the hysteresis in the system. Pfeiffer added the effect of thermal fluctuations to the Stoner–Wohlfarth model. This makes the hysteresis dependent on the size of the magnetic particle. As the particle size (and the time between jumps) decreases, it eventually crosses over into superparamagnetism.
 Adding particle interactions: Magnetostatic or exchange coupling between magnets can have a large effect on the magnetic properties. If the magnets are in a chain, they may act in unison, behaving much like Stoner–Wohlfarth particles. This effect is seen in the magnetosomes of magnetotactic bacteria. In other arrangements, the interactions may reduce the hysteresis.
 Generalizing to non-uniform magnetization: This is the domain of micromagnetics.

See also
 Stoner–Wohlfarth astroid
 Jiles–Atherton model
 Preisach model of hysteresis

Notes

References

External links 

Stoner-Wohlfarth magnetization reversal app

Magnetic hysteresis
Rock magnetism